Acleris decolorata is a species of moth of the family Tortricidae. It is found in India (Assam) and Afghanistan.

References

Moths described in 1964
decolorata
Taxa named by Józef Razowski
Moths of Asia